Hugh Masekela's Next Album is the fourth studio album by South African jazz trumpeter Hugh Masekela. It was recorded in New York City and released in December 1966 via MGM Records label. The album consists mainly of covers of pop songs.

Track listing

Personnel
Val Valentin – director of engineering
Frank Abbey – engineer, recording
David Greene – engineer, remix 
Hugh Masekela – liner notes 
Tom Wilson – producer

References

External links

 

1966 albums
MGM Records albums
Hugh Masekela albums
Albums produced by Tom Wilson (record producer)